NGC 202 is a lenticular galaxy located in the constellation Pisces. It was discovered on November 17, 1876 by Édouard Stephan.

See also 
 Lenticular galaxy 
 List of NGC objects (1–1000)
 Pisces (constellation)

References

External links 
 
 
 SEDS

0202
Lenticular galaxies
2394
Pisces (constellation)
Astronomical objects discovered in 1876
Discoveries by Édouard Stephan